Raquel Monteza (born Maria Teresa Calimbahin Rounsaville on September 30, 1955) is a Filipino actress.

Career
Monteza appeared in films such as What Am I Living For (1970) starring Eddie Peregrina, Kapag May Gusot, May Lusot (1973), Sapin-sapin, Patong-patong (1976), Bona (1980), Bakit Bughaw ang Langit? (1981), all starring Nora Aunor, and Zuma (1985) starring Max Laurel. She also appeared in Anthony Taylor's Dyesebel (1978) and Danny Zialcita's To Love Again (1983).

Monteza also appeared in TV series such as Anna Liza (1980) as Miriam starring Julie Vega, Sana Ay Ikaw Na Nga (2001) starring Dingdong Dantes and Tanya Garcia, Te Amo (2004) as Mercy, Undang's bubbly mother, starring Iza Calzado, Marimar" (2007) as Innocencia starring Marian Rivera and Dingdong Dantes aired in GMA Network, and Felina: Prinsesa ng mga Pusa (2012) starring Arci Muñoz, Ahron Villena and Carla Humphries, Ang Panday (2016) as Tiya Flor starring Richard Gutierrez aired in TV5.

Personal life
Monteza was born to an American father and a Filipino mother. She is married to former actor Jun Soler and is the mother of actors Ryan Soler (a FAMAS Best Child Actor awardee) and Symon Soler, who also became the lead singer of the Filipino boy band Jeremiah. Her other children are Miss Makati 2008 and singer Maffy Soler, who si also the wife of actor Robin da Roza, and Judge Soler.

Filmography

Film

Television

Maalaala Mo Kaya - "Board Game" (2008)
Maalaala Mo Kaya - "Card" (2008)
MariMar (2007)
Mga Kuwento ni Lola Basyang - "Ang Mahiwagang Kuba" (2007)
Maalaala Mo Kaya - "Pilat" (2007)
Calla Lily (2006)
Te Amo, Maging Sino Ka Man (2004)
Ang Iibigin Ay Ikaw Pa Rin (TV series) (2003)
Sana Ay Ikaw Na Nga (TV series) (2002)
Maalaala Mo Kaya - "Agua Bendita" (1999)
Anna Liza (1980-1985)

References

External links

1955 births
Living people
20th-century Filipino actresses
21st-century Filipino actresses
Filipino film actresses
Filipino people of American descent
Filipino television actresses